A British Picture is the autobiography of the English film director, Ken Russell. Its title was changed to Altered States in the United States.

When the author, Tony Fletcher, requested an interview with Russell as reference for his biography of the Who drummer, Keith Moon, Russell replied that he had already said everything he wanted to say about Moon in A British Picture. The book at no point mentions Moon.

Documentary
In 1989, Russell also made a documentary film about himself entitled A British Picture.

Notes

External links
A British Picture at IMDb
A British Picture At BFI

2008 non-fiction books
Show business memoirs
British autobiographies